The 2019 Southern Jaguars baseball team represented Southern University in the 2019 NCAA Division I baseball season. The Jaguars played their home games at Lee–Hines Field. They, along with the LSU Tigers baseball team, and the McNeese State Cowboys baseball team, were the only three teams in the state to make it to the NCAA Tournament. They were also the lone member from the SWAC Conference.

Roster

Coaching staff

Schedule

! style="" | Regular Season
|- valign="top" 

|- bgcolor="#ccffcc"
| 1 || February 15 || vs. Florida A&M || Wesley Barrow Stadium • New Orleans, LA || W 6-3 || 1-0 ||
|- bgcolor="#ccffcc"
| 2 || February 16 || vs. Grambling State || Wesley Barrow Stadium • New Orleans, LA || W 6–5 || 2–0 ||
|- bgcolor="#ccffcc"
| 3 || February 17 || vs. Alcorn State || Maestri Field at Privateer Park • New Orleans, LA || W 12-9 || 3–0 || 
|- bgcolor="#ffcccc"
| 4 || February 18 || vs. Air Force || Alex Box Stadium, Skip Bertman Field • Baton Rouge, LA || L 0–13 || 3–1 ||
|- bgcolor="#ffcccc"
| 5 || February 24 || at Northwestern State || H. Alvin Brown–C. C. Stroud Field • Natchitoches, LA || L 6–13 || 3–2 ||
|- bgcolor="#ccffcc"
| 6 || February 24 || at Northwestern State || H. Alvin Brown-C. C. Stroud Field • Natchitoches, LA || W 7–5 || 4–2 ||
|- bgcolor="#ffcccc"
| 7 || February 27 || at LSU || Alex Box Stadium, Skip Bertman Stadium • Baton Rouge, LA || L 4-17 || 4-3 ||
|-

|- bgcolor="#ccffcc"
| 9 || March 1 || Eastern Illinois || Lee–Hines Field • Baton Rouge, LA || W 10–8 || 5–3 ||
|- bgcolor="#ffcccc"
| 10 || March 1 || Eastern Illinois || Lee–Hines Field • Baton Rouge, LA || L 2–4 || 5–4 ||
|- bgcolor="#ccffcc"
| 11 || March 2 || Eastern Illinois || Lee–Hines Field • Baton Rouge, LA || W 5–3 || 6–4 ||
|- bgcolor="#ffcccc"
| 12 || March 2 || Eastern Illinois || Lee–Hines Field • Baton Rouge, LA || L 1–6 || 6–5 ||
|- bgcolor="#ffcccc"
| 13 || March 6 || at Southern Miss || Pete Taylor Park • Hattiesburg, MS || L 3–8 || 6–6 ||
|- bgcolor="#ccffcc"
| 14 || March 8 || Arkansas-Pine Bluff || Lee–Hines Field • Baton Rouge, LA || W 16–4 || 7–6 || 1-0
|- bgcolor="#ccffcc"
| 15 || March 8 || Arkansas-Pine Bluff || Lee–Hines Field • Baton Rouge, LA || W 9–4 || 8–6 || 2-0
|- bgcolor="#ccffcc"
| 16 || March 9 || Arkansas-Pine Bluf || Lee–Hines Field • Baton Rouge, LA || W 16-13 || 9–6 || 3-0
|- bgcolor="#ffcccc"
| 17 || March 12 || at Louisiana-Monroe || Warhawk Field • Monroe, LA || L 6–10 || 9–7 ||
|- bgcolor="#ffcccc"
| 18 || March 15 || at Texas Southern || MacGregor Park • Houston, TX || L 0–1 || 9–8 || 3–1
|- bgcolor="#ccffcc"
| 19 || March 16 || at Texas Southern || MacGregor Park • Houston, TX || W 1–0 || 10–8 || 4–1
|- bgcolor="#ccffcc"
| 20 || March 17 || at Texas Southern || MacGregor Park • Houston, TX || W 8-7 || 11–8 || 5-1
|- bgcolor="#ffcccc"
| 21 || March 19 || at Lamar || Vincent-Beck Stadium • Beaumont, TX || L 5-6 || 11–9 ||
|- bgcolor="#ccffcc"
| 22 || March 22 || Grambling State || Lee–Hines Field • Baton Rouge, LA || W 18-8 (8 inn) || 12–9 || 6-1
|- bgcolor="#ccffcc"
| 23 || March 23 || Grambling State || Lee–Hines Field • Baton Rouge, LA || W 15-13 || 13–9 || 7-1
|- bgcolor="#ccffcc"
| 24 || March 24 || Grambling State || Lee–Hines Field • Baton Rouge, LA || W 13-8 || 14–9 || 8-1
|- bgcolor="#ffcccc"
| 25 || March 26 || at New Orleans || Maestri Field at Privateer Park • New Orleans, LA || L 6–9 || 14–10 ||
|- align="center" bgcolor="#ffcccc
| 26 || March 27 || Northwestern State || Lee–Hines Field • Baton Rouge, LA || L 3–6 || 14–11 ||
|- bgcolor="#ffcccc"
| 24 || March 29 || Prairie View A&M || Lee–Hines Field • Baton Rouge, LA || L 6-10 || 14–12 || 8-2
|- bgcolor="#ccffcc"
| 24 || March 30 || Prairie View A&M || Lee–Hines Field • Baton Rouge, LA || W 26-7 (7 inn) || 15–12 || 9-2
|- bgcolor="#ccffcc"
| 24 || March 30 || Prairie View A&M || Lee–Hines Field • Baton Rouge, LA || W 8-5 || 16–12 || 10-2
|-

|- bgcolor="#ffcccc"
| 27 || April 2 || at Nicholls || Ben Meyer Diamond at Ray E. Didier Field • Thibodaux, LA || L 2-4 || 16–13 ||
|- bgcolor="#ccffcc"
| 28 || April 5 || at Memphis || FedExPark • Memphis, TN || W 6–1 || 17–13 ||
|- bgcolor="#ffcccc"
| 29 || April 6 || at Memphis || FedExPark • Memphis, TN || L 1–10 || 17–14 ||
|- bgcolor="#ffcccc"
| 30 || April 6 || at Memphis || FedExPark • Memphis, TN || L 12–14 (12 inn) || 17–15 ||
|- bgcolor="#ccffcc"
| 31 || April 9 || #8 LSU || Lee–Hines Field • Baton Rouge, LA || W 7–2 || 18–15 ||
|- bgcolor="#ccffcc"
| 32 || April 10 || New Orleans || Lee–Hines Field • Baton Rouge, LA || W 5–4 (10 inn) || 19–15 || 
|- bgcolor="#ccffcc"
| 33 || April 12 || at Arkansas-Pine Bluff || Torii Hunter Baseball Complex • Pine Bluff, AR || W 10–4 || 20–15 || 11–2
|- bgcolor="#ccffcc"
| 34 || April 12 || at Arkansas-Pine Bluff || Torii Hunter Baseball Complex • Pine Bluff, AR || W 21–2 (7 inn) || 21–15 || 12–2
|- bgcolor="#cccccc"
| 35 || April 14 || at Arkansas-Pine Bluff || Torii Hunter Baseball Complex • Pine Bluff, AR || colspan=4 |Game canceled
|- bgcolor="#ccffcc"
| 36 || April 16 || Alcorn State || Lee–Hines Field • Baton Rouge, LA || W 11-1 (7 inn) || 22–15 || 13–2
|- bgcolor="#ccffcc"
| 37 || April 20 || Texas Southern || Lee–Hines Field • Baton Rouge, LA || W 7–6 (12 inn) || 23–15 || 14–2
|- bgcolor="#ffcccc"
| 38 || April 20 || Texas Southern || Lee–Hines Field • Baton Rouge, LA || L 5–6 || 23–16 || 14-3
|- bgcolor="#ccffcc"
| 39 || April 21 || Texas Southern || Lee–Hines Field • Baton Rouge, LA || W 16–6 (7 inn) || 24–16 || 15-3 
|- bgcolor="#ffcccc"
| 40 || April 23 || Louisiana-Monroe || Lee–Hines Field • Baton Rouge, LA || L 4–5 || 24–17 ||
|- bgcolor="#ffcccc"
| 41 || April 26 || at Grambling State || Ralph Waldo Emerson Jones Park at Wilbert Ellis Field • Grambling, LA || L 0–12 || 24–18 || 15–4
|- bgcolor="#ffcccc"
| 42 || April 27 || at Grambling State || Ralph Waldo Emerson Jones Park at Wilbert Ellis Field • Grambling, LA || L 16–21  || 24–19 || 15–5
|- bgcolor="#ccffcc"
| 42 || April 28 || at Grambling State || Ralph Waldo Emerson Jones Park at Wilbert Ellis Field • Grambling, LA || W 15–3 (7 inn)  || 25–19 || 16–5
|-

|- bgcolor="#ccffcc"
| 43 || May 1 || Nicholls || Lee–Hines Field • Baton Rouge, LA || W 6–5 || 26–19 ||
|- bgcolor="#ccffcc"
| 44 || May 4 || at Prairie View A&M || Tankersley Field • Prairie View, TX || W 12-8 || 27–19 || 17–5
|- bgcolor="#ccffcc"
| 45 || May 5 || at Prairie View A&M || Tankersley Field • Prairie View, TX || W 6–4 || 28–19 || 18–5
|- bgcolor="#ffcccc"
| 46 || May 5 || at Prairie View A&M || Tankersley Field • Prairie View A&M || L 2–12 (7 inn) || 28–20 || 18–6
|- bgcolor="#ffcccc"
| 47 || May 7 || at New Orleans || Maestri Field at Privateer Park • New Orleans, LA || L 4–5 || 28–21 ||
|-

|-
! style="" | Post-Season
|- valign="top" 
|-

|- bgcolor="#ccffcc"
| 54 || May 15 || vs. Arkansas-Pine Bluff || Wesley Barrow Stadium • New Orleans, LA || W 11–7 || 29–21 ||
|- bgcolor="#ccffcc"
| 55 || May 16 || vs. Texas Southern || Wesley Barrow Stadium • New Orleans, LA || W 10-9 (10 inn) || 30-21 ||
|- bgcolor="#ffcccc"
| 56 || May 17 || vs. Texas Southern || Wesley Barrow Stadium • New Orleans, LA || L 6-8 || 30-22 ||
|- bgcolor="#ccffcc"
| 57 || May 18 || vs. Texas Southern || Wesley Barrow Stadium • New Orleans, LA || W 7-6 || 31-22 ||
|- bgcolor="#ccffcc"
| 57 || May 19 || vs. Alabama State || Wesley Barrow Stadium • New Orleans, LA || W 15-0 || 32-22 ||
|-

|- bgcolor="#cccccc"
| 58 || May 24 || vs. North Carolina A&T || Guarantee Rate Field • Chicago, IL || colspan=4| Game canceled
|-

|- bgcolor="#ffcccc"
| 58 || May 31 || vs. Mississippi State || Dudy Noble Field, Polk–DeMent Stadium • Starkville, MS || L 6-11 || 32-23 ||
|- bgcolor="#ffcccc"
| 58 || June 1 || vs. Miami || Dudy Noble Field, Polk–DeMent Stadium • Starkville, MS || L 2-12 || 32-24 ||
|-

|

Starkville Regional

References

Southern Jaguars
Southern Jaguars baseball seasons
Southern baseball
Southern